Jonathan David Larson (February 4, 1960 – January 25, 1996) was an American composer, lyricist and playwright most famous for writing the musicals Rent and Tick, Tick... Boom!, which explored the social issues of multiculturalism, substance use disorder, and homophobia. He received three posthumous Tony Awards and a posthumous Pulitzer Prize for Drama for Rent.

Early years
Larson was born in Mt. Vernon, New York to Nanette ( Notarius) and Allan Larson of White Plains, New York, on February 4, 1960. His family was Jewish. His grandfather, Bernard Isaac Lazarson, who was born in Russia, changed the family surname from Lazarson. At an early age, Larson played the trumpet and tuba, sang in his school's choir, and took piano lessons. His early musical influences and his favorite rock musicians included Elton John, The Doors, The Who, and Billy Joel, as well as the classic composers of musical theatre, especially Stephen Sondheim. He also loved Pete Townshend, The Police, Prince, Liz Phair, and The Beatles. Larson attended White Plains High School, where he was also involved in acting, performing in lead roles in various productions, graduating in 1978. He had a sister, Julie.

Larson attended Adelphi University in Garden City, New York, with a four-year scholarship as an acting major, in addition to performing in numerous plays and musical theatre, graduating in 1982 with a Bachelor of Fine Arts degree. Larson stopped acting to focus on compositions. During his college years, he began music composition, composing music first for small student productions, called cabarets, and later the score to a musical entitled The Book of Good Love (Libro de Buen Amor), written by the department head, Jacques Burdick, who was also Larson's college mentor.

As a student at Adelphi University, Larson co-wrote Sacrimmoralinority, a Brechtian-themed cabaret musical and his first musical, with David Glenn Armstrong. It was first staged at Adelphi University in the winter of 1981. After Larson and Armstrong graduated in 1982, they renamed it Saved! - An Immoral Musical on the Moral Majority. It played a four-week showcase run at Rusty's Storefront Blitz, a small theatre on 42nd Street in New York, Manhattan, and won both authors a writing award from ASCAP.

After graduating, Larson participated in a summer stock theatre program at the Barn Theatre in Augusta, Michigan, as a piano player, which resulted in his earning an Equity card for membership in the Actors' Equity Association.

Works

Superbia

In 1983, Larson planned to write a musical adaptation of George Orwell's book Nineteen Eighty-Four, which he planned to get produced in the year 1984; however, the Orwell estate denied him permission. Larson then began the process of adapting his work on 1984 into a futuristic story of his own, titled Superbia.

Superbia was modified many times. In the first drafts, the story, set in the year 2064, followed the character Josh Out, a member of OUTLAND, a society where emotions are erased from everyone at birth. Due to complications at birth, Josh maintained his emotions, and spent his life as an inventor, searching for something that could wake up the rest of his family and society. One day, Josh discovers a Music Box, which has the power to bring emotions to the other members of OUTLAND. He meets Elizabeth In, a girl his age from INCITY, who convinces him to spread the power of the music box. Josh travels to INCITY, where the INs live. The INs are the celebrities of this society who spend their days having their scripted lives filmed and transmitted to the OUTs as entertainment. In INCITY, Josh must face the temptations of fame in order to succeed on his mission. By the time Larson finished his final draft of the show, it was a much darker piece that took a deeper look into the power of emotions and mankind's attachment to technology. In this version, Josh was already married to Elizabeth at the beginning of the story and they are both OUTs. Like the other OUTs, Elizabeth is addicted to technology, and is unable to truly love. As the story begins, Josh leaves Elizabeth in order to find a greater life. Elizabeth wakes up from her technological trance and pursues Josh.

Superbia won the Richard Rodgers Production Award and the Richard Rodgers Development Grant. However, despite performances at Playwrights Horizons and a rock concert version produced by Larson's close friend and producer Victoria Leacock at the Village Gate in September 1989, Superbia never received a full production.

In the 2001 three-person musical version of Larson's monologue TICK, TICK... BOOM, the 11 o'clock number from the Musical Comedy version of Superbia, "Come to your Senses" was included. Another song from Superbia ("LCD Readout") was included on the 2007 album "Jonathan Sings Larson". In 2019, the song "One of these Days", originally sung by Josh near the beginning of the early drafts of Superbia, was included on the album "The Jonathan Larson Project".

On February 4, 2022, "Sextet Montage" was released on streaming platforms as a single, and is currently the only song from Superbia available for streaming.

Tick, Tick... Boom!

His next work, completed in 1991, was an autobiographical "rock monologue" entitled 30/90, which was later renamed Boho Days and finally titled Tick, Tick... Boom! This piece, written for only Larson with a piano and rock band, drew on his feelings of rejection caused by the disappointment of Superbia. The show was performed off-Broadway at the Village Gate in Greenwich Village, then at the Second Stage Theater on the Upper West Side. Both of these productions were produced by Victoria Leacock. The producer Jeffrey Seller saw a reading of Boho Days and expressed interest in producing Larson's musicals. After Larson's death, the work was reworked into a stage musical by playwright David Auburn and arranger and musical director Stephen Oremus. The stage version premiered off-Broadway in 2001 and starred Raúl Esparza as Larson, a performance for which he earned an Obie Award. It has since been produced on a West End theatre. A film adaptation of tick, tick... BOOM!, directed by Lin-Manuel Miranda and starring Andrew Garfield (in an Academy Award nominated performance) as Larson, with a rewritten script by Steven Levenson was released on Netflix on November 12, 2021.

In 1992, Larson collaborated with fellow composer/lyricists Rusty Magee, Bob Golden, Paul Scott Goodman, and Jeremy Roberts on Sacred Cows, which was devised and pitched to television networks as a weekly anthology with each episode taking a different Biblical or mythological story and giving it a '90s celebrity twist. The project was shelved due to scheduling conflicts among the five composers but resurfaced over 20 years later in a six-page Playbill article. The demo for Sacred Cows was released on iTunes.

Larson's strongest musical theatre influence was Stephen Sondheim, with whom he corresponded, and to whom he occasionally submitted his work for review. One tick, tick... BOOM! song, called "Sunday," is a homage to Sondheim, who supported Larson, staying close to the melody and lyrics of Sondheim's own song of the same title but turning it from a manifesto about art into a waiter's lament. Sondheim wrote several letters of recommendation for Larson to various producers. Larson later won the Stephen Sondheim Award.

In addition to his three larger theatrical pieces written before Rent, Larson also wrote music for J.P. Morgan Saves the Nation; numerous individual numbers; music for Sesame Street; music for the children's book cassettes of An American Tail and The Land Before Time; music for Rolling Stone magazine publisher Jann Wenner; a musical called Mowgli; and four songs for the children's video Away We Go!, which he also conceived with collaborator and composer Bob Golden and directed. He performed in John MacLachlan Gray's musical Billy Bishop Goes to War, which starred his close friend actor Roger Bart (Desperate Housewives). For his early works, Larson won a grant and award from the American Society of Composers, Authors and Publishers and the Gilman & Gonzalez-Falla Theatre Foundation's Commendation Award.

Rent

In 1988, playwright Billy Aronson wanted to create "a musical inspired by Giacomo Puccini's La bohème, in which the luscious splendor of Puccini's world would be replaced with the coarseness and noise of modern New York".

In 1989, Aronson called Ira Weitzman, asking for ideas for collaborators, and Weitzman introduced Larson to Aronson to collaborate on the new project. Larson came up with the title and suggested moving the setting from the Upper West Side to Lower Manhattan, where Larson and his roommates lived in a rundown apartment.

Rent started as a staged reading in 1993 at the New York Theatre Workshop, followed by a studio production that played a three-week run a year later. However, the version that is now known worldwide, the result of three years of collaboration and editing between Larson and the producers and director, was not publicly performed before Larson's death as Larson died the day before the first preview performance. The show premiered Off-Broadway on schedule. According to lead performer Anthony Rapp, Larson's parents, who were flying in for the show anyway, gave their blessing to perform the show despite Larson's death a day earlier, and the cast agreed that they would premiere the show by simply singing it through, all the while sitting at three prop tables lined up on stage. But by the time the show got to its high energy "La Vie Boheme", the cast could no longer contain themselves and did the rest of the show as it was meant to be, minus costumes, to the crowd and the Larson family's approval. Once the show was over, there was a long applause followed by silence which was eventually broken when an audience member shouted out "Thank you, Jonathan Larson."

Rent played through its planned engagement to sold-out crowds and was continually extended. The decision was finally made to move the show to a Broadway theatre, and it opened at the Nederlander Theatre on April 29, 1996. In addition to the New York Theatre Workshop, Rent was produced by Jeffrey Seller, who was introduced to Larson's work when attending an off-Broadway performance of Boho Days, and two of his producer friends who also wished to support the work, Kevin McCollum and Allan S. Gordon.

For his work on Rent, Larson was posthumously awarded the Pulitzer Prize for Drama, the Tony Award for Best Musical, Tony Award for Best Book of a Musical, and Tony Award for Best Original Score; the Drama Desk Award for Outstanding Book of a Musical, Drama Desk Award for Outstanding Music, and the Drama Desk Award for Outstanding Lyrics; the New York Drama Critics Circle Award for Best Musical; the Outer Critics Circle Award for Best Musical in the Off-Broadway category; and Obie Awards for Outstanding Book, Outstanding Lyrics, and Outstanding Music.

Larson's estate was scheduled to earn one-third of the amount earned by Rent.

Death
Larson died at his home in the early morning of January 25, 1996, ten days before his 36th birthday, the day before the first Off-Broadway preview performance of Rent. An autopsy determined Larson died from an aortic dissection. His body was found on the kitchen floor by his roommate at 3AM. Larson had been suffering severe chest pains, dizziness, and shortness of breath for several days before his death, but doctors at Cabrini Medical Center and St. Vincent's Hospital could not find signs of an aortic dissection even after conducting a chest X-ray and electrocardiogram, so his condition was misdiagnosed as influenza or stress. A court found that Larson "was misdiagnosed at both hospitals" and a medical malpractice lawsuit was settled for an undisclosed amount. New York State medical investigators concluded that Larson may have lived if the aortic dissection had been properly diagnosed and treated with cardiac surgery. It has been speculated that Larson had undiagnosed Marfan syndrome, a claim promoted by the National Marfan Foundation at the urging of the New York State Health Department.

Legacy
Rent played on Broadway at the Nederlander Theatre from its debut in April 1996 until September 7, 2008. It is the 11th longest running show in Broadway history. In addition, it has toured throughout the United States, Canada, Brazil, Japan, United Kingdom, Australia, China, Singapore, Philippines, Mexico, Germany, Poland, and throughout Europe, as well as in other locations. A film version of Rent was released in 2005.

After his death, Larson's family and friends started the Jonathan Larson Performing Arts Foundation to provide monetary grants to artists, especially musical theatre composers and writers, to support their creative work. The Jonathan Larson Grants are now administered by the American Theatre Wing, thanks to an endowment funded by the Foundation and the Larson Family.

In December 2003, Larson's work was given to the Library of Congress. The collection includes numerous musicals, revues, cabarets, pop songs, dance and video projects – both produced and un-produced.

Less than three years after Rent closed on Broadway, the show was revived Off-Broadway at Stage 1 of New World Stages just outside the Theater District. The show was directed by Michael Greif, who had directed the original productions. The show began previews on July 14, 2011, and opened August 11, 2011.

From October 9 to 14, 2018, Feinstein's/54 Below presented The Jonathan Larson Project, a concert of several previously unheard songs by Larson. The show was conceived and directed by Jennifer Ashley Tepper. It starred George Salazar, Lauren Marcus, Andy Mientus, Krysta Rodriguez, and Nick Blaemire. A CD of the show was released by Ghostlight Records in April 2019.

Jonathan is portrayed by actor Andrew Garfield in the biographical musical drama Tick, Tick... Boom! which was released on the streaming service Netflix on November 19, 2021. The film received generally positive reviews from critics, with high praise for director Lin-Manuel Miranda’s direction in his directorial debut, score, and musical sequences, and Garfield's performance garnering universal acclaim. It was named one of the best films of 2021 by the American Film Institute, and was nominated for the Academy Award for Best Actor, Golden Globe Award for Best Motion Picture – Musical or Comedy and Golden Globe Award for Best Actor – Motion Picture Musical or Comedy (Garfield) at the 79th Golden Globe Awards, with Garfield winning the latter.

Jonathan Larson Grants
In memory of Larson, in 1996, the Larson family along with the Jonathan Larson Performing Arts Foundation established an award honoring emerging musical theater writers and composers. In 2008, the American Theatre Wing adopted and continued on the legacy through the Jonathan Larson Grants, an unrestricted cash gift to aid in the creative endeavors of the writers and promote their work. Notable winners of the grant include Dave Malloy, Laurence O'Keefe, Nell Benjamin, Amanda Green, Joe Iconis, Pasek and Paul, Shaina Taub and Michael R. Jackson.

Personal life
In college, Larson dated Victoria Leacock. He also dated a dancer for four years who sometimes left him for other men, though she eventually left him for a woman. These experiences influenced the autobiographical aspects of Rent.

Larson lived and died in a loft with no heat on the fifth floor of 508 Greenwich Street, on the corner of Greenwich Street and Spring Street in Lower Manhattan. He lived with various roommates over the years, including Greg Beals, a journalist for Newsweek magazine and the brother of actress Jennifer Beals. For a while, he and his roommates kept an illegal wood-burning stove because of lack of heat in their building.

From the spring of 1985, when he was 25 years old, until October 21, 1995, when he quit since Rent was being produced by the New York Theatre Workshop, Larson worked as a waiter at the Moondance Diner on the weekends and worked on composing and writing musicals during the week. Many people came to the diner to meet Larson. He was involved in writing the employee manual. At the diner, Larson met Jesse L. Martin, who was his waiting trainee and later performed the role of Tom Collins in the original cast of Larson's Rent.

Awards and nominations

References

External links

1960 births
1996 deaths
20th-century American composers
20th-century American dramatists and playwrights
20th-century American Jews
20th-century American male writers
Adelphi University alumni
American musical theatre composers
American musical theatre lyricists
American people of Russian-Jewish descent
Broadway composers and lyricists
Deaths from aortic dissection
Jewish American composers
Jewish American dramatists and playwrights
Jewish American songwriters
People from White Plains, New York
Pulitzer Prize for Drama winners
Songwriters from New York (state)
Tony Award winners
White Plains High School alumni